Andrew Cottrell Boswell  (September 6, 1873 – February 3, 1936) was a Major League Baseball pitcher. After playing at the University of Pennsylvania he played for the Washington Senators and New York Giants of the National League during the 1895 season. He finished his career in the Western League in 1896.

Boswell left baseball and became an attorney, residing in Ocean City, New Jersey.

He was elected as a Republican from Cape May County, New Jersey to the New Jersey General Assembly, serving in 1920 and 1921.

References

Sources

1873 births
1936 deaths
Major League Baseball pitchers
Baseball players from New Jersey
New York Giants (NL) players
Washington Senators (1891–1899) players
19th-century baseball players
Columbus Buckeyes (minor league) players
Columbus Senators players
Republican Party members of the New Jersey General Assembly
New Jersey lawyers
People from Ocean City, New Jersey
Sportspeople from Burlington County, New Jersey